Mahendra Nath Pandey (born 15 October 1957) is an Indian politician currently serving as 
Minister of Heavy Industries he previously served as Minister for Skill Development and Entrepreneurship of India and Member of Lok Sabha for Chandauli since 2014. He is a member of Bharatiya Janata Party and is the president of the party's Uttar Pradesh unit. He has also served as Union Minister of State for Ministry of Human Resource Development between 2016 and 2017. He is a member of Modi's second ministry. On 30 May 2019, he was appointed as Cabinet minister for Skill Development and Entrepreneurship, Government of India.

Early life

Pandey was born at Pakhanpur, Uttar Pradesh to Sudhakar Pandey and Chandrawati Pandey in a Brahmin family. He received a postgraduate degree in Journalism and completed his Ph.D in Hindi from Banaras Hindu University. In 1973, he was elected president of the students' union of C.M. Anglo Bengali College. Five years later, he became the general secretary of the students' union of Banaras Hindu University.

Pandey spent five months in prison during the Emergency. In 1978, he joined Rashtriya Swayamsevak Sangh. He took part in the Ram Janmabhoomi movement and was booked under the National Security Act by the Mulayam Singh Yadav-led state government.

In 1991, Pandey was elected to the Uttar Pradesh Legislative Assembly for the first time. In 1996, he was re-elected to the assembly. He received the portfolio of Minister of State for Housing and Urban Development the following year in the Kalyan Singh ministry. He also served as Minister of State for Planning (Independent charge) between 1998 and 2000, and Minister of State, Panchayati Raj between 2000 and 2002.

Ahead of the 2014 Indian general election, Bharatiya Janata Party announced that Pandey would contest from the Chandauli constituency of Purvanchal. He was elected to the Lok Sabha after defeating his nearest rival Anil Maurya of the Bahujan Samaj Party by a margin of approximately 150,000 votes. Subsequently, he was made a member of Standing Committee on Rural Development and Consultative Committee for Ministry of Steel and Mines.

On 5 July 2016, in a major cabinet reshuffle, Pandey took the oath of office as Union Minister of State for Human Resource Development in the First Modi ministry. On 31 August 2017, he was replaced by Satyapal Singh. That same day, he was appointed president of the Uttar Pradesh unit of the Bharatiya Janata Party. He replaced Keshav Prasad Maurya.

In the Cabinet announcement made on 31 May 2019, Pandey has been given the post of  Minister of Skill Development and Entrepreneurship in the 17th Lok Sabha under Prime Minister Narendra Modi.

Personal life
Pandey's family originally hails from the village of Pakhanpur. He married Pratima Pandey on 8 February 1985 and they have one daughter.

References

|-

|-

Living people
India MPs 2014–2019
People from Chandauli district
Lok Sabha members from Uttar Pradesh
1957 births
Bharatiya Janata Party politicians from Uttar Pradesh
Uttar Pradesh MLAs 1991–1993
Uttar Pradesh MLAs 1997–2002
Politicians from Ghazipur
Narendra Modi ministry
India MPs 2019–present
People from Ghazipur